Orville Howard Phillips (April 5, 1924 – April 24, 2009) was a Canadian dental surgeon, politician, and senator.

Early life
Born in O'Leary, Prince Edward Island, the son of J. S. and Maude Phillips, he received his D.D.S. from Dalhousie University in 1952.

Career
He practised dentistry for many years.

In 1957, he was elected to the House of Commons of Canada representing the riding of Prince. A member of the Progressive Conservative Party of Canada, he served as Member of Parliament (MP) until 1962.

In 1963, he was appointed to the Senate, representing the senatorial division of Prince, Prince Edward Island. A Progressive Conservative, he was the last senator serving in the Senate who was appointed for life. A change in the law meant that senators could only serve until turning 75. All senators for life who had been appointed before the change were grandfathered in to allow them to serve beyond that, but many agreed to abide by the law and resign at 75. Phillips was the last remaining life senator and chose to resign from the Senate upon turning age 75 in 1999.

Personal life
He married Marguerite Woodside in 1945. They had four children: Brian, Betty, Robert and Patricia.

References

External links
 

1924 births
2009 deaths
People from Prince County, Prince Edward Island
Canadian dentists
Members of the United Church of Canada
Dalhousie University alumni
Canadian senators from Prince Edward Island
Members of the House of Commons of Canada from Prince Edward Island
Progressive Conservative Party of Canada senators
Legislators with life tenure
20th-century dentists